Sixteen Rounds is a 2021 Ugandan film written and directed by Loukman Ali starring Michael Wawuyo Jr. and Natasha Sinayobye. The short film premiered on YouTube  on September 16, 2021 and marks the second installment to The Blind Date, an anthology of short films between Usama Mukwaya and Loukman Ali. The film's sound track is designed by long time collaborator, Andrew Ahuura and features songs by Keneth Mugabi and Fred Masagazi.

Plot 
The film revolves around a former army man Captain Ddamba (Michael Wawuyo Jr.) and his wife Dorothy Natasha Sinayobye
and their messy love life characterized by infidelity.

Cast 
 Michael Wawuyo Jr. as Captain Ddamba
 Natasha Sinayobye as Dorothy
 Aganza Prince as Jerome
 Jack Sserunkuma as Louis
 Patriq Nkakalukanyi
 Raymond Rushabiro

Feature film adaptation 
Loukman announced in October that a feature length film titled Ddamba based on the Sixteen Round's story is in the making

Awards

Won

 2021: Best Short Film, 7th Mashariki African Film Festival
 2022: Best Short Film, 43rd Durban International Film Festival

Nominated
 2022: Best Short Film, 11th Luxor African Film Festival
 2022: Best Short Film, 9th Uganda Film Festival Awards

 2023: Best Short Film, 1st iKON Awards

References

External links 
 

Ugandan short films
Films shot in Uganda
Films produced by Usama Mukwaya
2020s English-language films